Maha Thammaracha II, born as Lue Thai, was a king of the Sukhothai Kingdom, a historical kingdom of Thailand.

Ancestry

References

Kings of Sukhothai
1399 deaths
Thai princes
14th-century Thai people
1358 births